Symphlebia foliosa is a moth in the subfamily Arctiinae first described by Seitz in 1921. It is found in Bolivia.

References

foliosa